Emma Spencer (née Ramsden; born 26 June 1978) is a British television presenter and horse racing journalist and pundit.

Career
Emma Spencer started her career as a jockey, twice winning champion amateur flat jockey. In 2001 Spencer joined Channel 4 Racing and quickly became one of the lead presenters for the channel's flat racing coverage, covering British horse racing festivals including the Derby, Royal Ascot and Glorious Goodwood, as well as international contests such as the Dubai World Cup, the Prix de l'Arc de Triomphe, and the Melbourne Cup. In 2014 Spencer joined 888sport as resident horse racing authority.

Personal life
Spencer lives in Newmarket, Suffolk. In February 2005 she married Irish jockey Jamie Spencer. Together they have three children, Charlie, Chloe, and Ella. The couple divorced in 2010.

References

1978 births
Living people
British horse racing writers and broadcasters
English jockeys
English television presenters
English women journalists
British female equestrians